Edward Kelham House is a historic home located near Garrett in Keyser Township, DeKalb County, Indiana.  It was built in 1870, and is a two-story, Italianate-style frame dwelling with Greek Revival detailing. It has one-story, hip roofed, Colonial Revival style front porch supported by Tuscan order columns.  It has unfluted corner pilasters and a plain wide frieze.

It was added to the National Register of Historic Places in 1983.

References

Houses on the National Register of Historic Places in Indiana
Italianate architecture in Indiana
Greek Revival houses in Indiana
Colonial Revival architecture in Indiana
Houses completed in 1870
Houses in DeKalb County, Indiana
National Register of Historic Places in DeKalb County, Indiana